Alessandro Silva de Araújo (born 28 February 1986), known by his nickname Peri, is a Brazilian footballer who plays for Santa Cruz as a left back

Career statistics

References

External links

1986 births
Living people
Sportspeople from Alagoas
Brazilian footballers
Association football defenders
Clube Sociedade Esportiva players
Sinop Futebol Clube players
Associação Atlética Santa Rita players
Associação Atlética Coruripe players
Club Sportivo Sergipe players
Sociedade Desportiva Juazeirense players
Salgueiro Atlético Clube players
Sport Club do Recife players
Ituano FC players
Clube de Regatas Brasil players
Paysandu Sport Club players
Botafogo Futebol Clube (SP) players
Esporte Clube XV de Novembro (Piracicaba) players
Esporte Clube Água Santa players
Campeonato Brasileiro Série B players
Campeonato Brasileiro Série C players
Campeonato Brasileiro Série D players